Hippolyte d'Albis is a French economist, born November 24, 1973 in London, specializing in demographic issues. He is a professor at Pantheon-Sorbonne University and the Paris School of Economics.
He is Deputy Director for Science at the CNRS Institute for Social Sciences and Humanities in charge of research in economics, management, geography and regional studies and a member of the Institut Universitaire de France and the Cercle des économistes.

Biography
D'Albis obtained a master's degree in finance at the University of Paris 2 Panthéon-Sorbonne in 1996, a master's degree in Mathematical Economics at École Centrale Paris in 1994, and a PhD in economics at University Paris 1 Panthéon-Sorbonne in 2003.

He was recruited as an Assistant Professor in economics at the Université Toulouse 1 Capitole in 2004, full Professor at University Montpellier 3 Paul Valéry in 2006, and became Full Professor at University Paris 1 Panthéon-Sorbonne and the Paris School of Economics in 2011. In 2014, he became director of the Doctoral School, and since 2015, he has been Deputy Director for Science at the CNRS Institute for Social Sciences and Humanities.

D'Albis serves as an associate editor of the Journal of Demographic Economics, the Journal of the Economics of Ageing and Public Finance Review.

Distinctions
Award by the Fondation pour les sciences sociales, 2015
Prix du meilleur jeune économiste, Cercle des Économistes & Le Monde, 2012
European Research Council starting grant, 2011
Member of the Institut Universitaire de France, 2009
Philippe Michel's prize for the young researcher in economic dynamics, Paris School of Economics, 2009

Academic publications

Academic works

Immigration
D'Albis has worked on the macro-economic impacts of immigration in France. With Boubtane and Coulibaly, he produced evidence that suggests that non-European migration has a positive impact on economic growth. Most notably, he showed the positive impact of family migration and migration of women. He is also working on the measurement of migration flows.

Intergenerational transfers
D'Albis is the director of the French team of the National Transfers Accounts, an international project that decomposes by age the variables of the National Accounts. This project permits comparisons across generations. D'Albis has provided evidence suggesting that the standards of living of recent French generations has not fallen compared to previous generations.

References

1973 births
Living people
French economists
Academic staff of Paris-Sorbonne University
Academic staff of the Paris School of Economics